Dedeman is a hypermarket chain with 100% Romanian capital offering home improvement and do-it-yourself goods. The motto is "Dedicat planurilor tale", which translates "Dedicated to your plans". It is based in Bacău and operates 55 stores (September 2020) in the country.
Dedeman was created in 1992, by two brothers Adrian and Dragoș Pavăl.

History
Dedeman was founded in 1992 in Bacău, Romania, its first store initially measuring modest proportions, only 16 square meters, selling various retail merchandise. Dedeman recorded a rapid growth of success, presently owning 58 stores.

Since 2010, Dedeman is the DIY market leader in Romania by turnover and since 2012 also by number of stores.

In October 2011, Dedeman became, for the first time, sponsor of the Romanian Olympic and Sporting Committee for two years. The partnership continued in 2015, under the brand "Team Romania", when Dedeman became Main Partner of the Romanian Olympic and Sporting Committee for a period of 5 years.

In 2014, Dedeman signed a sponsorship with the Romanian tennis player Simona Halep.

In 2015, Dedeman became the fourth biggest player in the Central and East Europe DIY market, with a market share of 1,9%, according to a study by PMR Research.

Financial figures

Number of Employees
 2020: 11,374
2019: over 11.000
 2018: over 10.600
2017: over 10.000
 2016: over 9200
 2015: 8259
 2014: over 7200
 2013: over 6.700 
 2012: over 5800
 2011: over 4.300

Turnover:
 2019: 1,73 billion euros
 2018: 1,55 billion euros
 2017: 1,38 billion euros
2016: 1,17 billion euros
 2015: 981 million euros
 2014: 767 million euros
 2013: 606 million euros
 2012: 540 million euros
 2011: 476 million euros
 2010: 360 million euros
 2009: 250 million euros
 2008: 250 million euros
 2007: 197 million euros

Number of stores:
 2021: 57
 2020: 54
 2019: 50
 2018: 49
2017: 48
 2016: 45
 2015: 41
 2014: 40
 2013: 36 
 2012: 30 
 2011: 26

References

External links
Dedeman
DedemanAutomobile

Retail companies of Romania
Romanian brands
Companies based in Bacău
Hardware stores